Nototodarus is a genus of squid. Example species in this genus include Nototodarus sloanii, a species sought for human food; in the process of harvesting N. sloanii Australian sea lions are frequently killed, since that marine mammal preys upon this squid species. Furthermore, New Zealand arrow squid, N. sloanii, is an important food source for the endangered yellow-eyed penguin, Megadyptes antipodes.

Species
Nototodarus gouldi 
Nototodarus hawaiiensis 
Nototodarus sloanii

References

 
Molluscs of New Zealand